Saint Francis High School may refer to: 

Saint Francis High School (Calgary), Alberta, Canada

United States (sorted by state):
Saint Francis High School (La Cañada Flintridge, California)
Saint Francis High School (Mountain View, California)
St. Francis High School (Sacramento, California), an all-female college preparatory school
Saint Francis Central Coast Catholic High School, Watsonville, California
St. Francis High School (Gainesville, Florida), renamed St. Francis Catholic Academy in 2016
 St. Francis Schools (Atlanta area, Georgia), grades K-12 in Alpharetta, Georgia
Saint Francis School (Hawaii), grades PK–12 in Honolulu, Hawaii
St. Francis High School (Wheaton, Illinois)
Saint Francis High School (Louisville), Kentucky
St. Francis High School (Traverse City, Michigan)
Saint Francis High School (Saint Francis, Minnesota)
St. Francis High School (Humphrey, Nebraska)
Saint Francis High School (Athol Springs), New York
St. Francis Preparatory School, Queens, New York
Saint Francis High School (St. Francis, Wisconsin)

See also
 List of schools named after Francis Xavier
 St. Francis Borgia Regional High School, Washington, Missouri
 St. Francis de Sales High School (disambiguation)